
Gmina Nowe is an urban-rural gmina (administrative district) in Świecie County, Kuyavian-Pomeranian Voivodeship, in north-central Poland.

Villages
Apart from the town of Nowe, Gmina Nowe contains the villages and settlements of Dolne Morgi, Głodowo, Kończyce, Kozielec, Milewo, Pastwiska, Piaski, Przyny, Twarda Góra, Zabijak and Zabudowania Gajewskie.

Neighbouring gminas
Gmina Nowe is bordered by the gminas of Dragacz, Gniew, Grudziądz, Osiek, Sadlinki, Smętowo Graniczne and Warlubie.

References
Polish official population figures 2006

Nowe
Świecie County